WEC 39: Brown vs. Garcia was a mixed martial arts event held by World Extreme Cagefighting that took place on March 1, 2009 in Corpus Christi, Texas. The event aired live on the Versus Network. WEC Featherweight Champion Mike Brown made his first title defense against number one contender Leonard Garcia at this event.

Background
An originally announced title fight rematch between WEC Welterweight Champion Carlos Condit and challenger Brock Larson was cancelled when Larson suffered an injury in training. It was then announced that following this event, the WEC would dissolve their welterweight division into the UFC.

Richard Crunkilton was scheduled to face Bart Palaszewski at this event in what was originally slated to be a WEC Lightweight Championship title eliminator. However, Crunkilton was pulled from the bout due to an injury and was replaced by WEC newcomer Ricardo Lamas.

Justin Haskins was originally slated to face WEC newcomer Douglas Lima at this event, but Lima was forced out of the event due to delays in getting paperwork from the U.S. Bureau of Citizenship and Immigration Services. Lima was replaced by fellow WEC newcomer Mike Pierce.

WEC featherweight fighter and former UFC Lightweight Champion Jens Pulver filled in for Frank Mir on color commentary for this event, joining Todd Harris on the announce team.

The event drew an estimated 531,000 viewers on Versus.

Results

Bonus Awards
Fighters were awarded $7,500 bonuses.

Fight of the Night:  Johny Hendricks vs.  Alex Serdyukov
Knockout of the Night:  Damacio Page
Submission of the Night:  Mike Brown

See also
 World Extreme Cagefighting
 List of World Extreme Cagefighting champions
 List of WEC events
 2009 in WEC

External links
Official WEC website

References

World Extreme Cagefighting events
2009 in mixed martial arts
Mixed martial arts in Texas
Sports in Corpus Christi, Texas
2009 in sports in Texas